Materdomini is an Italian hamlet (frazione) situated in the municipality of Caposele, Province of Avellino, Campania. As of 2009 its population was of 735.

History
Materdomini's name,  a Latin word meaning Mother of God, derives from an ancient chapel dedicated to Santa Maria Materdomini, first mentioned in 1500. On October 16, 1755, Gerard Majella (originally of Muro Lucano) died in this chapel and was buried there. He was canonized in 1904. Mainly for this reason, during the first half of the 20th century, it grew into a village in the neighborhood of the Basilica of San Gerardo Maiella, one of the most important and respected Catholic sanctuaries  of Campania and the surrounding areas.

Geography
The town is located in the valley where the spring of the Sele river (in Caposele) is located and close to the Picentini mountain range. It is two km from Caposele, five from Teora, seven from Lioni, nine from Laviano (in the Province of Salerno). The exit "Caposele" of the rapid road Lioni-Contursi serves Materdomini directly.

Personalities
Gerard Majella (1726-1755), Roman Catholic saint

References

External links

Basilica of Materdomini's page of Caposele official website

Frazioni of the Province of Avellino
Caposele